Evan David Skillman (born January 27, 1955 in Rochester, New York) is an American astronomer and astrophysicist.

Education and career
Evan Skillman graduated in 1977 with a B.A. in physics from Cornell University and in 1984 with a Ph.D. in astronomy from Seattle's University of Washington. In 1989 Skillman became a faculty member in the University of Minnesota's astronomy department, where he is now the director of the Minnesota Institute for Astrophysics and a College of Science and Engineering Distinguished Professor. He took leave of absence for sabbatical years at Garching's Max Planck Institute for Astrophysics, where his host was Simon White, and at the University of Cambridge's Institute of Astronomy, where his host was Stephen Smartt. In 2012 and 2013, Skillman was one of the leaders of the Panchromatic Hubble Andromeda Treasury (PHAT) project. Part of the project made available large amounts of Hubble Space Telescope image data and used volunteer citizen scientists to analyze stellar clusters in the Andromeda Galaxy. The large number of citizen scientists accomplished in 12 days what would have taken the far smaller team of professional scientists approximately one year.

Skillman has done research on "the interstellar medium, the stellar populations, the chemical abundances, and the dark matter content of nearby galaxies, with a focus on dwarf galaxies." In 2018 he was elected a Fellow of the American Physical Society for "observational constraints on the primordial helium abundance and significant contributions to understanding the chemical evolution of galaxies."

Family
His sister, Leslie Elaine Skillman-Hull (1953–2020), was an assistant professor in women's health care and an accomplished potter. In 1990 in Minnesota, Evan Skillman married Kimberley Ann Venn, now a professor of physics and astronomy at the University of Victoria. They have a daughter, but are now divorced. He has since remarried.

Selected publications

Articles
  (over 700 citations)
 
 
 
 
 
 
 
 
  (over 400 citations)
 
  (over 500 citations)
  (over 500 citations)
 
 
 
  (over 400 citations)

Books

References

1955 births
Living people
20th-century American astronomers
21st-century American astronomers
Cornell University alumni
University of Washington alumni
University of Minnesota faculty
Fellows of the American Physical Society
Scientists from Rochester, New York